Miopelecanus is a fossil genus of pelicans, with the species M. gracilis, dating from the Early Miocene.

References

Pelicans
Miocene birds
Prehistoric life of Europe
Fossil taxa described in 1863
Taxa named by Alphonse Milne-Edwards